Alan Finlayson (1 September 1900 – 28 October 2001) was a South African cricketer. He played for Eastern Province between 1921 and 1922.

See also
 Lists of oldest cricketers
 List of centenarians (sportspeople)

References

External links

1900 births
2001 deaths
Men centenarians
South African centenarians
South African cricketers
Eastern Province cricketers
Cricketers from Port Elizabeth